Jackie Bouvier is the name of:

 Jacqueline Kennedy Onassis (née Bouvier) (1929–1994), American political-family member and editor
 Jacqueline Ingrid Bouvier, a fictional character from The Simpsons